The fourth competition weekend of the 2011–12 ISU Speed Skating World Cup was held in the Utah Olympic Oval in Salt Lake City, United States, from Saturday, January 21, until Sunday, January 22, 2012.

Schedule of events
The schedule of the event is below:

Medal summary

Men's events

Women's events

References

External links

4
Isu World Cup, 2011-12, 4
Sports in Salt Lake City